The 1987 Wansdyke Council election was held on Thursday 7 May 1987 to elect councillors to Wansdyke District Council in England. It took place on the same day as other district council elections in the United Kingdom.

The 1987 election saw the Conservatives win the largest number of seats and maintain majority control.

Election results

Ward results
The ward results listed below are based on the changes from the 1983 elections, not taking into account any party defections or by-elections. Sitting councillors are marked with an asterisk (*).

Bathampton

Batheaston

Bathford

Cameley

Camerton

Charlcombe

Chew Magna

Chew Stoke

Clutton

Compton Dando

Farmborough

Freshford

Hartprees

High Littleton

Hinton Charterhouse

Keynsham East

Keynsham North

Keynsham South

Keynsham West

Midsomer Norton North

Midsomer Norton Redfield

Newton St Loe

Paulton

Peasedown St John

Publow

Radstock

Saltford

Stowey Sutton

Timsbury

Westfield

References

Wansdyke
1987